James Harry Covington (May 3, 1870 – February 4, 1942) was a United States representative from Maryland and Chief Justice of the Supreme Court of the District of Columbia. He founded the major law firm of Covington & Burling.

Education and career

Born on May 3, 1870, in Easton, Talbot County, Maryland, Covington received academic training in the public schools of Talbot County and the Maryland Military and Naval Academy at Oxford. He received a Bachelor of Laws in 1894 from the University of Pennsylvania Law School. He entered private practice in Easton starting in 1894. He was an unsuccessful Democratic nominee for the Maryland Senate in 1901. He was state's attorney for Talbot County from 1903 to 1908.

Congressional service

Covington was elected as a Democrat from Maryland's 1st congressional district to the United States House of Representatives of the 61st, 62nd and 63rd United States Congresses and served from March 4, 1909, until his resignation on September 30, 1914, to accept a judicial position.

Federal judicial service

Covington was nominated by President Woodrow Wilson on June 8, 1914, to the Chief Justice seat on the Supreme Court of the District of Columbia (now the United States District Court for the District of Columbia) vacated by Chief Justice Harry M. Clabaugh. He was confirmed by the United States Senate on June 15, 1914, and received his commission the same day. His service terminated on May 31, 1918, due to his resignation.

Special investigation

Covington was well regarded by President Wilson, who in 1917 gave him charge of an investigation of the radical trade union the Industrial Workers of the World (IWW). The investigation lasted several weeks and preceded coordinated mass raids by the United States Department of Justice against the IWW on September 5, 1917.

Later career and death

Covington returned to private practice in Washington, D.C. from 1918 to 1942. He was a Professor of Law for Georgetown University from 1914 to 1919. He was a member of the Railway Wage Commission in 1918. He died on February 4, 1942, in Washington, D.C. He was interred in Spring Hill Cemetery in Easton.

Covington & Burling

Covington and Edward B. Burling established the law firm of Covington & Burling on January 1, 1919. Nine decades later Covington & Burling remained the oldest law firm in Washington, D.C., maintaining a staff of more than 1,000 attorneys and operating regional offices in New York, Los Angeles, Palo Alto, and San Francisco as well as international offices in the United Kingdom, China, Belgium, South Korea, Germany, South Africa and Dubai.

Other service

Covington served as Worthy Grand Master on the Supreme Executive Committee of the Kappa Sigma fraternity from 1892 to 1894.

References

Sources

External links
 
 

1870 births
1942 deaths
District of Columbia judges
Georgetown University Law Center faculty
Judges of the United States District Court for the District of Columbia
People from Easton, Maryland
United States district court judges appointed by Woodrow Wilson
20th-century American judges
University of Pennsylvania Law School alumni
Railway Wage Commission
Democratic Party members of the United States House of Representatives from Maryland
People associated with Covington & Burling